Pasquale Berardi (born 3 January 1983 in Bari, Italy) is an Italian footballer. He plays as a midfielder. He is currently playing for Italian Serie D team Sulmona.

External links
Profile at lega-calcio.it

Living people
1983 births
Italian footballers
Serie B players
S.S.C. Bari players
U.S. Catanzaro 1929 players
A.C. Ancona players
A.S.D. Martina Calcio 1947 players
A.S. Sambenedettese players
S.P.A.L. players
Pro Sulmona Calcio 1921 players
A.S.D. Calcio Ivrea players
Association football midfielders